Danzy Senna is an American novelist and essayist. She is the author of five books and numerous essays about gender, race and motherhood, including her first novel, Caucasia (1998), and her most recent novel, New People (2017). Her writing has appeared in The New Yorker, The Atlantic, Vogue and The New York Times. She is a professor of English at the University of Southern California.

Early life and education

Danzy Senna was born and raised in Boston, Massachusetts, the middle of three children. Her parents are the poet and novelist Fanny Howe, who is white, and the editor Carl Senna, who is black. They married in 1968, the year after interracial marriage became legal, and Senna was born in 1970. They divorced in 1976. Growing up, Senna divided her time between her mother and father's homes. Senna's maternal grandmother is Irish actress and playwright Mary Manning, who acted for Dublin's Gate Theatre.

Senna attended Brookline High School and Stanford University. She earned an MFA in creative writing from  University of California, Irvine, where she began and completed her first novel, Caucasia, which won several awards and became required reading for many college courses.

Works

Caucasia
Senna's first novel, Caucasia (1998), is narrated by a young biracial girl, Birdie Lee, who is taken into the political underground by her mother, and forced to live under an assumed identity. The coming of age story follows Birdie's struggle for identity and her search for the missing parts of her family. The novel received the Book of the Month Club's Stephen Crane Award for First Fiction, was nominated for the Orange Prize for Fiction, and won the Alex Award from the American Library Association. It was also longlisted for the International Dublin Literary Award and was named a Los Angeles Times "Best Book of the Year". Caucasia, a national bestseller, has been translated into ten languages. When Senna published Caucasia, her father called to demand a loan.

Symptomatic
Her second novel, Symptomatic (2004), is a psychological thriller narrated by an unnamed young woman who moves to New York City for what promises to be a dream job – a prestigious fellowship writing for a respected magazine. The narrator feels displaced, however, and is unsure of how she fits into the world around her. She becomes the object of an older woman's attention after they bond over their similarly mixed heritage. As the older woman's interest turns into obsession, the narrator must figure out what their relationship means to her, even as both of their lives seem to spiral out of control.

Where Did You Sleep Last Night?
Senna's two novels were followed by the memoir Where Did You Sleep Last Night?: A Personal History (2009). She recounts the story of her parents, who married in 1968. Her mother was a white woman with a blue-blood Bostonian lineage. Her father was a black man, the son of a single mother and an unknown father. Senna recalls her father being determined "to hammer racial consciousness home to his three light-skinned children." Decades later, Senna looked back not only at her parents’ divorce, but at the family histories they tried so hard to overcome. Her often painful journey through the past is epitomized by the question posed to her as a young child by her father: "Don’t you know who I am?". In 2010, Danzy's father, Carl Senna, sued Senna for "libel, privacy invasion, fraud, and misappropriation of his name and likeness" in the book and claimed she had misled him in telling him what the book was about in order to get information from him for the work.

You Are Free
Senna's short story collection, You Are Free (2011), was described by Kirkus Review as, "Deft, revealing stories [from] a writer for our time...a fresh, insightful look into being young, smart and biracial in postmillennial America." In the title story, a woman's strange correspondence with a girl claiming to be her daughter leads her into the doubts and what-ifs of the life she hasn't lived. In "The Care of the Self," a new mother hosts an old friend, still single, and discovers how each of them pities and envies the other. In the collection's first story, "Admission," tensions arise between a liberal husband and wife after their son is admitted into the elite daycare school to which they’d applied only on a lark.

New People
Senna's most recent book, New People (2017) tells the story of mixed-race Maria and her fiancé Khalil, who live together in '90s Fort Greene, then populated by black artists and bohemians. The seemingly perfect "King and Queen of the Racially Nebulous Prom" is troubled by Maria's fixation on a black poet she barely knows. The novel was in part inspired by Senna's fascination with the Jonestown massacre. The New Yorker praised the novel for making "keen, icy farce of the affectations of the Brooklyn black faux-bohemia." Time magazine listed the novel as one of the Top Ten Novels of the year.

Awards
2017: Dos Passos Prize
2004: Fellow, New York Public Library's Cullman Center for Scholars and Writers
2002: Whiting Award
Book of the Month Award for First Fiction (Caucasia)
American Library Association's Alex Award (Caucasia)
Longlisted for the International Dublin Literary Award (Caucasia)
Listed as a Los Angeles Times Best Book of the Year (Caucasia)

Books
Caucasia, 1998. Riverhead Books: New York. .
Symptomatic: A Novel, 2003. Riverhead Books: New York. .
Where Did You Sleep Last Night?: A Personal History, 2009. Farrar, Straus and Giroux: New York. .
You Are Free (Stories), 2011. Riverhead Books: New York. .
New People, 2017. Riverhead Books: New York. .

References

External links
  – official site
 Publisher's Brief Bio Danzy Senna
 Kleeman, Alexandra, "Once Upon a Time in Post-Racial America", New York Times Book Review, Sunday, October 8, 2017.
 Sehgal, Parul, "‘New People’ Riffs on Race and Love, With a Twist", New York Times, August 15, 2017 
 St. Félix, Doreen, "Danzy Senna's New Black Woman", The New Yorker, August 7, 2017
 Felsenthal, Julia, "Danzy Senna Doesn't Mind if Her New Novel Makes You Uncomfortable", Vogue, August 3, 2017
 Press, Joy, "Author Danzy Senna on Finding Inspiration After Leaving Brooklyn", New York Magazine, August 2017
 Jerkins, Morgan, "The Old Problems of New People", The New Republic, June 22, 2017.
 Bellot, Gabrielle, "The Ineradicable Color Line: Danzy Senna's New People", Los Angeles Review of Books, August 1, 2017.
 Curry, Ginette, "Toubab La!: Literary Representations of Mixed-race Characters in the African Diaspora", Cambridge Scholars Pub., Newcastle, England, 2007.

20th-century American novelists
21st-century American novelists
American women novelists
African-American novelists
Writers from Boston
1970 births
Living people
20th-century American women writers
21st-century American women writers
Novelists from Massachusetts
Brookline High School alumni
Stanford University alumni
University of California, Irvine alumni
University of Southern California faculty
American women academics
20th-century African-American women writers
20th-century African-American writers
21st-century African-American women writers
21st-century African-American writers